Marsha Canham (born November 19, 1950) is a Canadian writer of historical romance novels since 1984. She has won two Romantic Times Lifetime Achievement Awards, as well as multiple awards for individual books including Best Historical of the Year, Best Medieval of the Year, Best book of the Year, Storyteller of the Year, Best Swashbuckler of the Year.

Biography
Canham was born in Toronto, Ontario, Canada, where she resides, to a policeman and a homemaker. Marsha has one son and two grandchildren. Her sister is Canadian politician Carolyn Parrish.

In 1984, Marsha published her first historical romance, titled China Rose, and has seventeen such novels in print, including one contemporary romance. She is best known for her award-winning romance trilogies, one set in Scotland: The Pride of Lions, The Blood of Roses, and Midnight Honor. The other is set in Medieval England and deals with her own interpretation of the Robin Hood legend: Through a Dark Mist, In the Shadow of Midnight, and The Last Arrow. She is currently working on the fourth book of her pirate wolf saga that began with Across A Moonlit Sea  The Iron Rose and The Following Sea.

She has won two Romantic Times Lifetime Achievement Awards. plus multiple individual awards including being listed as "One of the seven best mass market fiction books of the year" by Publishers Weekly for The Iron Rose.

Bibliography

As Marsha Canham

Single Novels
China Rose, 1984
Bound by the Heart, 1984
The Wind and the Sea, 1986
Under the Desert Moon, 1992
Straight for the Heart, 1995
Pale Moon Rider, 1998
Swept Away, 1999
The Dragon Tree (previously published as My Forever Love), 2004

Scotland Series
The Pride of Lions, 1988
The Blood of Roses, 1989
Midnight Honor, 2001

Robin Hood Series
Through a Dark Mist, 1991
In the Shadow of Midnight, 1994
The Last Arrow, 1997
My Forever Love, 2003

Dante Pirates Series
Across a Moonlit Sea, 1996
The Iron Rose, 2003
The Following Sea, 2012
The Far Horizon, 2017

Short Stories/Novellas
What the Heart Sees (published in the anthology Masters of Seduction), 2011

As Marsha M. Canham

Single Novels
Dark and Dangerous, 1992

References and sources

External links
Homepage
List of books in FantasticFiction
Biography at New American Library

1951 births
Canadian romantic fiction writers
Canadian women novelists
Living people
Women romantic fiction writers
Writers from Toronto
20th-century Canadian novelists
20th-century Canadian women writers
21st-century Canadian novelists
21st-century Canadian women writers